Evergestis antofagastalis is a moth in the family Crambidae. It is found in Chile.

References

Moths described in 1959
Evergestis
Moths of South America
Endemic fauna of Chile